Gabriel Hargues (20 April 1904 – 7 July 1982) was a French racing cyclist. He rode in the 1931 Tour de France.

References

1904 births
1982 deaths
French male cyclists
Place of birth missing